Maculavirus is a genus of viruses in the order Tymovirales, in the family Tymoviridae. Plants serve as natural hosts. There is only one species in this genus: Grapevine fleck virus.

Structure
Viruses in Maculavirus are non-enveloped, with icosahedral and isometric geometries. The diameter is around 30 nm. Genomes are linear, around 7.5kb in length.

Life cycle
Entry into the host cell is achieved by penetration into the host cell. Replication follows the positive stranded RNA virus replication model. Positive stranded RNA virus transcription is the method of transcription. The virus exits the host cell by monopartite non-tubule guided viral movement.
Plants serve as the natural host. The virus is transmitted via a vector (unknown). Transmission routes are vector and mechanical.

References

External links
 Viralzone: Maculavirus
 ICTV

Tymoviridae
Virus genera